The  Trussed Concrete Steel Company  was founded in 1903 by Julius Kahn, an engineer and inventor. Its headquarters were in Detroit, Michigan, and its steel factory was in Youngstown, Ohio. The long company name changed to a shortened version of "Truscon" for public relations. Julius brought his brother Albert into the company for his architectural skills.  The company manufactured prefabricated products of reinforced concrete beams and steel forms for reinforced concrete floors and walls. This allowed floor plans to have longer spans than in conventional construction. The solid-slab reinforced concrete construction produced better shearing stresses. Larger walls could be built with fewer supports which meant larger exterior windows could be used for better sunlight and ventilation.

Kahn invented and patented a unique reinforcement system technology, the Kahn system, that was stronger, more economical, and lighter than the then existing systems for building construction. It used tab flanges that were permanently attached on steel beams that distributed the tension for improved strength in concrete. Packard Automotive Plant in Detroit became the first to have that type of factory built in the United States using his scientific method of reinforced concrete.  The company capitalized on its proprietary system for twenty years and was successful worldwide. The prefabricated reinforced concrete products became the dominant product exported to Europe, Asia, Central America and South America between World Wars I and II competing against foreign products of similar nature.

History
In 1903, Julius Kahn founded and became president of the Trussed Concrete Steel Company in a small Michigan building with a dozen employees who manufactured specially designed steel products for reinforced concrete beams and walls. The company's headquarters were in Detroit. The main manufacturing site for the steel products was originally in Detroit from 1903 to 1906 when a  industrial site was developed in Youngstown, Ohio, at a cost of a million dollars. The new steel factory officially opened its doors in May 1907 with 100 employees. The move to Youngstown took place to exploit the city's easy access to raw materials for steel production. The main office remained in Detroit at Lafayette Boulevard and Wayne Street in a new eight-story skyscraper designed by Julius' brother Albert in 1907. The Trussed Concrete Building (later called the Owen Building) was the first Detroit office building constructed from concrete. The Cadillac Motor Car Company factory at 450 Amsterdam Street in Detroit, completed in November 1905, was the country's first automobile factory using reinforced concrete for its construction.

The name, "Trussed Concrete Steel Company" was difficult for public comprehension and was shortened to "Truscon". However, the name was not officially changed to Truscon Steel Company until 1918. Truscon produced steel building materials including high ribbed steel forms for floors, ceilings, and walls. The old method was to use plain straight smooth steel beams or loose rods or stirrups in concrete beams and floors. The improved system used 45 degree tab flanges or "wings" permanently attached on steel beams that distributed the tension stress for overall improvement in strength of reinforced concrete. Kahn's new technology became a standard throughout the building industry, and the company's products were used in over 15,000 structures worldwide by 1914. The factory developed derivatives from the initial Kahn Bar patent the company was based upon and manufactured new steel reinforcement products from 1907 through 1914 for concrete construction of industrial buildings. The company expanded its product lines again in 1915 to include prefabricated, ready-to-assemble on site buildings in kit form. It made products under the brand names of Hy-Rib, Rib Lath, Kahn Bars, Rib Bars, Rib Metal, and United Steel Sash.

Kahn's system of reinforced concrete beams enabled long span open floor room space, longer than could be built using wood. This allowed solid-slab construction which maintained better shearing stresses. Large walls with fewer supports meant exterior wall generous-sized windows could be installed, providing better natural sunlight and ventilation. This factory design concept was known as the "Kahn Daylight System." The company offered a wide selection of prefabricated steel products for reinforcement, meeting customer needs and specifications. Trusco provided collapsible column reinforcements, steel joists, and standardized steel forms. The company expanded into several divisions like Truscon Laboratories, also based in Detroit. A 1924 maintenance book from Truscon gave instructions on how to maintain a large industrial building with illustrations of "graduate engineers" as white-coated scientists.

Kahn, with his brother Albert, capitalizing on the compatible relationship between steel and concrete, exported their prefabricated products to European and Asian markets. Their products became the dominant prefabricated reinforcement product exports between World Wars I and II, competing against French and Chinese products. The company hired agents in Central America, South America, Europe and Asia.  The earliest British examples of the use of the Kahn system of reinforced concrete factories was in 1913 for the Arrol-Johnson Motor Company and the Albion Motor Car Company. Truscon developed a manufacturing factory about 1915 in Japan for the Asian market, selling its interest to Mitsui Company in 1933.

The company capitalized on its proprietary system for twenty years and was successful in capturing most of the market share worldwide. The Kahn Bar patent then expired and others developed non-proprietary systems of reinforced concrete. By 1930 the Kahn system of reinforced concrete became obsolete compared to more modern, economical-to-manufacture reinforcement techniques. In 1937 the company was bought by Republic Steel; Julius Kahn was named vice-president of this new entity.

Disaster and publicity
In 1906, most of the buildings that survived the San Francisco earthquake and the aftermath fire were those built with the Kahn system by the Trussed Concrete Steel Company. In many subsequent cases, Trusco's engineering services were specified for rebuilding commercial buildings in San Francisco. The company received additional unintentional beneficial publicity when earthquakes occurred in Italy in Calabria in 1905 and Messina in 1907; Jamaica also 1907; and the 1911 Philippines Mount Taal volcano eruption.

Truscon steel products
According to a 1910 specification booklet published by Trussed Concrete Steel Company, the following were some products the company manufactured and sold.
 Kahn Trussed Bars—for reinforcing concrete beams, girders, joists and arches
 Rib Metal—for reinforcing slabs and walls
 Column Hooping—for reinforcing conduits
 Rib Bars (originally called Cup-Bars)—for reinforcing columns
 Hy-Rib—for reinforcing floors, roofs, walls, and ceilings
 Rib Lath—a clinching material for plaster and stucco to adhere to
 Rib Studs—to provide openings for the passage of conduits, wires, and plumbing
 Window Casements—fireproof windows for factories and industrial buildings
 Floor and partition tile
 Building block and joist hangers
 Stair treads and post caps
 Floor enamel and foundation coats
 Waterproofing paste
 Wall finishes and coatings
 Truscon Standard Buildings in kit form.

An example: a gas station assembled on site from pre-designed ready-made parts.

See also

References

Bibliography

Further reading
  Banham, Reyner (1989) – A Concrete Atlantis: U.S. Industrial Building and European Modern Architecture 1900–1925 
  Kahn, Albert (1921) – Albert Kahn, Architect, Detroit Michigan 
  Kahn, Albert (1918) – Reinforced Concrete
  Kahn, Albert (1924) – Reinforced Concrete Architecture These Past Twenty Years
  Kahn, Albert (1903) – Concrete and Metal Construction 
  Marquis, Albert Nelson (1914) – The Book of Detroiters: A Biographical Dictionary of Leading Living Men of the City of Detroit / Biography of Julius Kahn

External links

Video on "Engineering Industrial Architecture: Albert Kahn and the Trussed Concrete Steel Company" 
 Michigan Historical Collections, Bentley Historical Library, University of Michigan, Albert Kahn Papers, 1896–2011

Composite materials
Concrete
Structural engineering
1903 establishments in Michigan
Manufacturing companies established in 1903
Manufacturing companies based in Michigan
Manufacturing companies disestablished in 1937
1937 disestablishments in Michigan
1937 mergers and acquisitions
Defunct manufacturing companies based in Detroit